The 1965 UCI Track Cycling World Championships were the world championships for track cycling that took place in San Sebastián, Spain from 6 to 12 September 1965. Nine events were contested, 7 for men (3 for professionals, 4 for amateurs) and 2 for women.

Medal summary

Medal table

See also
 1965 UCI Road World Championships

References

Track cycling
UCI Track Cycling World Championships by year
Sport in San Sebastián
1965 in track cycling
International cycle races hosted by Spain